Dwarf emu, or lesser emu, refers to either of the two small emu types:

Kangaroo Island emu
King Island emu

Birds by common name